Barbus laticeps is a species of ray-finned fish in the  family Cyprinidae.
It is found only in Tanzania.
Its natural habitat is rivers.

References

Enteromius
Taxa named by Georg Johann Pfeffer
Fish described in 1889
Taxonomy articles created by Polbot